Oxygenated chemical compounds contain oxygen as a part of their chemical structure.  The term usually refers to oxygenated chemical compounds added to fuels.  Oxygenates are usually employed as gasoline additives to reduce carbon monoxide and soot that is created during the burning of the fuel. Compounds related to soot, such as polyaromatic hydrocarbons (PAHs) and nitrated PAHs, are also reduced.

The oxygenates commonly used are either alcohols or ethers:
 Alcohols:
 Methanol (MeOH)
 Ethanol (EtOH); see also Common ethanol fuel mixtures
 Isopropyl alcohol (IPA)
 n-Butanol (BuOH)
 Gasoline grade tert-butanol (GTBA)
 Ethers:
 Methyl tert-butyl ether (MTBE)
 tert-Amyl methyl ether (TAME)
 tert-Hexyl methyl ether (THEME)
 Ethyl tert-butyl ether (ETBE)
 tert-Amyl ethyl ether (TAEE)
 Diisopropyl ether (DIPE)

In the United States

In the United States, the Environmental Protection Agency had authority to mandate that minimum proportions of oxygenates be added to automotive gasoline on regional and seasonal basis from 1992 until 2006 in an attempt to reduce air pollution, in particular ground-level ozone and smog.  In addition to this North American automakers have in 2006 and 2007 promoted a blend of 85% ethanol and 15% gasoline, marketed as E85, and their flex-fuel vehicles, e.g. GM's Live Green, Go Yellow campaign.  US Corporate Average Fuel Economy (CAFE) standards give an artificial 54% fuel efficiency bonus to vehicles capable of running on 85% alcohol blends over vehicles not adapted to run on 85% alcohol blends.  There is also alcohols' intrinsically cleaner combustion, however due to its lower energy density it is not capable of producing as much energy per gallon as gasoline.  Much gasoline sold in the United States is blended with up to 10% of an oxygenating agent.  This is known as oxygenated fuel and often (but not entirely correctly, as there are reformulated gasolines without oxygenate) as reformulated gasoline.  Methyl tert-butyl ether (MTBE) was the most common fuel additive in the United States, prior to government mandated use of ethanol.

References

External links
 EPA Definition of Oxygenates
 USGS Definition of Oxygenates

Petroleum products
Fuels